The 2002 Atlantic Coast Conference men's basketball tournament took place from March 7–10 in Charlotte, North Carolina, at the second Charlotte Coliseum. Duke won the tournament for the fourth year in a row, defeating NC State in the championship game. Duke's Carlos Boozer won the tournament's most valuable player award.

The University of Maryland finished in first place during the regular season but lost to NC State in the semifinal round. Maryland went on to win the NCAA Championship for the first time.

Duke defeated all three of their in-state rivals on their way to the tournament championship, beating North Carolina in the quarterfinal round, Wake Forest in the semifinal, and NC State in the championship game.

The 2002 tournament was the last one held at Charlotte Coliseum. Shortly after the ACC Tournament, the NBA Hornets moved to New Orleans. The NBA subsequently awarded Charlotte an expansion team, who requested a new arena be constructed in central Charlotte. The Coliseum therefore closed in 2005 and was imploded in 2007. Future ACC Tournaments in Charlotte have been played at the considerably smaller Spectrum Center.

Bracket

AP Rankings at time of tournament

External links
 

Tournament
ACC men's basketball tournament
College sports in North Carolina
Basketball competitions in Charlotte, North Carolina
ACC men's basketball tournament
ACC men's basketball tournament